Matthew Walsh (4 July 1887 – 21 June 1975) was an Irish cyclist who competed in two events for Great Britain at the 1912 Summer Olympics.

References

External links
 

1887 births
1975 deaths
British male cyclists
Irish male cyclists
Olympic cyclists of Great Britain
Cyclists at the 1912 Summer Olympics
Sportspeople from Dublin (city)